Imre Peterdi (born 31 May 1980) is a Hungarian former professional ice hockey player. 

Peterdi played in the 2009 IIHF World Championship for the Hungary national team.

Career statistics

Austrian Hockey League

References

External links

1980 births
Fehérvár AV19 players
Dunaújvárosi Acélbikák players
Ferencvárosi TC (ice hockey) players
Hungarian ice hockey players
Living people
Naprzód Janów players
Sportspeople from Dunaújváros
Újpesti TE (ice hockey) players